Narvacan, officially the Municipality of Narvacan, is a 2nd class municipality in the province of Ilocos Sur, Philippines. According to the 2020 census, it has a population of 46,234 people.

History
A Spanish expeditionary force sent from Vigan by the military officer and navigator, Captain Juan de Salcedo was shipwrecked along the town's coast in 1576. When they were being rescued by the natives, the Spaniards asked the natives what was the name of their place. The resident's leader replied in an Ilocano dialect by asking the Spaniards "Nalbakan?" (Are you shipwrecked?). The Spaniards thought this to be the answer to their question, and from then on the place was referred to as Narvacan.

Salcedo befriended the small tribe of indigenous valley peoples that resided in the area while Spanish families established a township in 1576.  As part of the modern township, a Roman Catholic parish was established by the Augustinian religious order on 25 April 1587.  The Narvacan parish would become one of the first Roman Catholic parishes in present-day Ilocos Sur.

Narvacan was organized under the traditions of the royal government of Spain.  The Habsburg royal family served as the heads of state which in turn appointed Santiago de Vera as President of the Royal Audiencia – governor over the region in which Narvacan was situated.  In 1589, Governor Vera appointed Nicolas de Figueroa as the first Encomendero de Narvacan – principal administrator of the town and its neighbors in the encomienda system.  His role eventually evolved into the office of alcalde.

Geography

Barangays
Narvacan is politically subdivided into 34 barangays. These barangays are headed by elected officials: Barangay Captain, Barangay Council, whose members are called Barangay Councilors. All are elected every three years.

Climate

Demographics

In the 2020 census, Narvacan had a population of 46,234.

Economy

Government
Narvacan, belonging to the second congressional district of the province of Ilocos Sur, is governed by a mayor designated as its local chief executive and by a municipal council as its legislative body in accordance with the Local Government Code. The mayor, vice mayor, and the councilors are elected directly by the people through an election which is being held every three years.

Elected officials

Education
The Narvacan School of Fisheries, a branch of the Ilocos Sur Polytechnic State College (ISPSC), has been located in Sulvec since 1964. It is also the base of operations of the Philippine Army's 503rd Infantry Brigade which oversees the Citizen Armed Forces Geographical Units.

References

External links

Municipality of Narvacan Homepage
Pasyalang Ilocos Sur
Philippine Standard Geographic Code
Philippine Census Information
Local Governance Performance Management System

Municipalities of Ilocos Sur